The Housing (Scotland) Act 2014 is an Act of the Scottish Parliament which received royal assent on 1 August 2014.

Part 1: Abolition of the Right to Buy
Part 1 of the Act provides for the abolition of the right to buy policy which allowed secure tenants of councils and some housing associations the legal right to buy, at a large discount, the home they are living in. This took effect on 1 August 2016, allowing for two years in which existing council tenants could decide whether they wished to buy their home. The policy marked a significant divergence from that undertaken in England and Wales, with the UK Government legislating to extend right to buy to tenants in housing associations.

Part 3: Short Scottish Secure Tenancies and Antisocial Behaviour Powers
The Act simplifies the eviction process in cases involving antisocial behaviour by allowing social landlords to make use of an existing conviction as grounds for possession. 
   
The Act clarifies that a social landlord can suspend an application for social housing under the following circumstances:   
 There is evidence that the applicant, a member of their household or a visitor has been engaged in antisocial behaviour in or near their home or towards the landlord’s staff;
 The applicant has previously been evicted by a court order;   
 The applicant has lost a previous tenancy through abandonment; 
 The applicant has been evicted under the Housing (Scotland) Act 2001 for damage to the home or its contents; 
 The applicant has outstanding rent arrears and there is no arrangement in place;
 The applicant has previously provided false information to obtain a tenancy;
 The applicant has unreasonably refused the offer of one or more homes.

Assignation and Sub-letting
The Act specifies that any person seeking assignation, subletting or joint tenancy of a social rented home, must have been living in that home as their main residence for a period of at least 12 months prior to the application, as opposed to six months.

Improving Standards in Rented Accommodation
The Act introduces new requirements for private landlords to provide carbon monoxide detectors and have electrical fixtures, fittings and appliances tested for safety every five years.

References

Acts of the Scottish Parliament 2014
Housing legislation in the United Kingdom
Housing in Scotland